Amandara is a village in Samarkand Region, Uzbekistan, Central Asia. It is located in Nurobod District just north of Route A378.

References

 "Amandara, Samarqand Viloyati, Uzbekistan", Falling Rain Genomics, Inc.
 "Amandara, Samarkand, Uzbekistan" map and aerial imagery, Maplandia

Populated places in Samarqand Region